Monitory may refer to:
 Monition 
 Monitory Democracy